In probability theory, Boole's inequality, also known as the union bound, says that for any finite or countable set of events, the probability that at least one of the events happens is no greater than the sum of the probabilities of the individual events. This inequality provides an upper bound on the probability of occurrence of at least one of a countable number of events in terms of the individual probabilities of the events. Boole's inequality is named for its discoverer, George Boole.

Formally, for a countable set of events A1, A2, A3, ..., we have

In measure-theoretic terms, Boole's inequality follows from the fact that a measure (and certainly any probability measure) is σ-sub-additive.

Proof

Proof using induction 
Boole's inequality may be proved for finite collections of  events using the method of induction. 

For the  case, it follows that

For the case , we have

Since  and because the union operation is associative, we have

Since 

 

by the first axiom of probability, we have

and therefore

Proof without using induction 
For any events in in our probability space we have

One of the axioms of a probability space is that if  are disjoint subsets of the probability space then

this is called countable additivity.

If we modify the sets , so they become disjoint,

we can show that

by proving both directions of inclusion.

Suppose . Then  for some minimum  such that . Therefore . So the first inclusion is true: .

Next suppose that . And  so , and we have the other inclusion: .

By construction of each , . For  it is the case that 

So,  we can conclude that the desired inequality is true:

Bonferroni inequalities
Boole's inequality may be generalized to find upper and lower bounds on the probability of finite unions of events. These bounds are known as Bonferroni inequalities, after Carlo Emilio Bonferroni; see .

Define

and

as well as

for all integers k in {3, ..., n}.

Then, for odd k in {1, ..., n},

and for even k in {2, ..., n},

Boole's inequality is the initial case, k = 1.  When k = n, then equality holds and the resulting identity is the inclusion–exclusion principle.

Example 
Suppose that you are estimating 5 parameters based on a random sample,  and you can control each parameter separately. If you want your estimations of all five parameters to be good with a chance 95%, what should you do to each parameter?

Obviously, controlling each parameter good with a chance 95% is not enough because "all are good" is a subset of each event "Estimate i is good". We can use Boole's Inequality to solve this problem. By finding the complement of event "all fives are good", we can change this question into another condition: 

P( at least one estimation is bad) = 0.05 ≤ P( A1 is bad) + P( A2 is bad) + P( A3 is bad) + P( A4 is bad) + P( A5 is bad) 

One way is to make each of them equal to 0.05/5 = 0.01, that is 1%. In another word, you have to guarantee each estimate good to 99%( for example, by constructing a 99% confidence interval) to make sure the total estimation to be good with a chance 95%. This is called Bonferroni Method of simultaneous inference.

See also
 Diluted inclusion–exclusion principle
 Schuette–Nesbitt formula
 Boole–Fréchet inequalities
Probability of the union of pairwise independent events

References

Other related articles 
 
 
 
 
 

Probabilistic inequalities
Statistical inequalities